Ramanan is a 1967 Indian Malayalam-language romantic musical film written, directed and produced by D. M. Pottekkat. It is an adaptation of Ramanan (1936), a poem by Changampuzha Krishna Pillai. The film stars Prem Nazir and Sheela. Madhu, Kottayam Chellappan, Kamaladevi, Meenakumari, Ramu Kariat, Adoor Bhasi, Usha Kumari and Manavalan Joseph play other important roles. The film was noted for its technical brilliance and for being the adaptation of an immortal poetical work, but was a box office flop.

Cast
Prem Nazir as Ramanan 
Sheela as Chandrika 
Madhu as Madhanan 
Kottayam Chellappan as Advocate Peshkar
Meena (Malayalam actress) as Madhavi Amma
Ramu Kariat as Rajan 
Sankaradi as Krishnan Nair
Kottayam Chellappan
Nellikkode Bhaskaran as Ramu
Chithralekha
Kamaladevi as Bhanumati
Usha Kumari/Vennira Aadai Nirmala as Karthi 
Adoor Bhasi as the temple priest
Manavalan Joseph as Vallon, Karthi's father

Soundtrack
The music was composed by K. Raghavan and the lyrics were written by Changampuzha.

References

External links 
 

1960s Malayalam-language films
1960s romantic musical films
1967 films
Films based on poems
Indian romantic musical films